= H3LiIr2O6 =

Synthetic chemical material

Identifiers
3D model (JSmol)	Interactive image
- InChI: InChI=1S/2Ir.Li.3H2O.3O/h;;;3*1H2;;;/q+1;+2;+1;;;;;;-1/p-3 Key: ZIVDHQDNRFTRLH-UHFFFAOYSA-K
- SMILES: [Li+].[O-][Ir](=O)[OH].[OH][Ir](=O)[OH]

Properties
Chemical formula	H_{3}LiIr_{2}O_{6}
- Except where otherwise noted, data are given for materials in their standard state (at 25 °C [77 °F], 100 kPa). Infobox references

H_{3}LiIr_{2}O_{6} is claimed to be a Kitaev spin liquid.

H_{3}LiIr_{2}O_{6} is considered to be a spin liquid that is proximate to the Kitaev-limit quantum spin liquid. Its ground state shows no magnetic order or spin freezing as expected for the spin liquid state. However, hydrogen zero-point motion and stacking faults are known to be present.
